Luther Gulick is the name of:

 Luther Gulick (physician) (1865–1918), American physical education instructor, international basketball official, and founder of the Camp Fire Girls
 Luther Gulick (social scientist) (1892–1993), scholar of public administration
 Luther Halsey Gulick, Sr. (1828–1891), missionary who was father and grandfather of above